Günther Brendel (often incorrectly named in sources as Günter Brendel) (born in Weida on 17 January 1930) is a German painter and graphic artist.
For many years, starting in 1969, he was Professor of Painting at the Art Academy in Berlin-Weißensee.

Life
Brendel trained and initially worked as a Decorative painter between 1944 and 1948.   He then studied, till 1951, under Hans Hofmann-Lederer and Hermann Kirchberger at the Weimar Saxon-Grand Ducal Art School.  After the Weimar art school was reorganised to become an architecture college, Brendel switched to the Dresden Academy of Fine Arts where he continued his studies under Fritz Dähn and Rudolf Bergander. He then, in 1954, worked briefly as a freelance artist in Dresden.

After moving to Berlin he took a position as an assistant at the Art Academy in the city's Weißensee district.   He remained at The Academy, with promotions in 1956 and again in 1959 when he became an assistant professor in painting. A lectureship followed in 1964.   In 1969, he took over as the Academy's Professor of Painting.

Study tours have taken him to the Soviet Union, Romania and Bulgaria. However, he and his wife continue to live in Berlin.

Exhibitions 
 Berlin 1956, 1980, 2007 and 2008 
 Casablanca 1967 
 Weißenfels 1968
 Rudolstadt 1970

Awards 
1960 Erich Weinert Medal - Art Prize of the FDJ, especially for his painting Fest der Jugend (Youth festival)
1964, 1969 and 1975 Art Prize of the FDGB
1967 Art Prize of the German Democratic Republic
1969 and 1979 Berlin Goethe prize
1971 National Prize of East Germany
1973 Theodor-Körner Prize (GDR)
1976 Banner of Labor

References

1930 births
Living people
People from Weida, Thuringia
German printmakers
20th-century German painters
20th-century German male artists
German male painters
Academic staff of the Berlin University of the Arts
Recipients of the National Prize of East Germany
Recipients of the Banner of Labor
Academic staff of the Weißensee Academy of Art Berlin
21st-century German painters
21st-century German male artists